Slaves of Beauty is a 1927 American silent comedy drama film directed by John G. Blystone and starring Olive Tell, Holmes Herbert, Earle Foxe, Margaret Livingston, and future talent agent Sue Carol. The film was written by William M. Conselman from a story by Nina Wilcox Putnam entitled "The Grandflapper," edited by Margaret Clancey and photographed by L. William O'Connell, with intertitles by James Kevin McGuinness. The movie, released by the Fox Film Corporation, is a comedic send-up of the beauty salon industry with a running time of 60 minutes.

Cast
Olive Tell as Anastasia Jones
Holmes Herbert as Leonard Jones
Earle Foxe as Paul Perry
Margaret Livingston as Goldie
Sue Carol as Dorothy Jones
Richard Walling as Robert
Mary Foy as Irishwoman
Mickey Bennett (small role)

Preservation status
The film is now lost.

References

External links

Slaves of Beauty at Turner Classic Movies
Slaves of Beauty in the New York Times
Slaves of Beauty in the American Film Institute Catalog

1927 films
American silent feature films
Films directed by John G. Blystone
Lost American films
Fox Film films
Films based on short fiction
American black-and-white films
Lost comedy-drama films
1927 comedy-drama films
1920s American films
1920s English-language films
Silent American comedy-drama films